A tautophrase is a phrase or sentence that repeats an idea in the same words. The name was coined in 2006 by William Safire in The New York Times.

Examples include:

 "Brexit means Brexit" (Theresa May)
 "A man's gotta do what a man's gotta do." (John Wayne)
 "It ain't over 'till it's over" (Yogi Berra)
 "What's done is done." (Shakespeare's Macbeth)
 "I am that I am." (God, Exodus 3:14)
 "Tomorrow is tomorrow" (Antigone (Sophocles))
 "A rose is a rose is a rose." (Gertrude Stein)
 "Sometimes a cigar is just a cigar." (Sigmund Freud)
 "A man's a man for a' that." (Robert Burns)
 "I yam what I yam and that's all that I yam!" (Popeye)
 "Cars are cars." (Paul Simon song title)
 "Let bygones be bygones."
 "Facts are facts."
 "Enough is enough."
 "A deal is a deal is a deal."
 "Once it's gone it's gone."
 "It is what it is."
 "Boys will be boys."
 "A win is a win."
 "You do you."
 "A la guerre comme à la guerre" — A French phrase literally meaning "at war as at war", and figuratively roughly equivalent to the English phrase "All's fair in love and war"
 Qué será, será or che será, será — English loan from Spanish and Italian respectively, meaning "Whatever will be, will be."
 "Call a spade a spade."
 "Once you’re committed, you’re committed."
 "What wins out wins out."
 "You can only plan if you have a plan."
 "I don’t care how much you know, if you get caught in a fire, you’re caught in a fire."
 "Befehl ist Befehl" ("an order is an order")

See also
Ploce (figure of speech)
Repetition (rhetorical device)
Tautology
Platitude

References
Safire, William (2006). "On language: Tautophrases" The New York Times, May 7, 2006.

2006 neologisms
Rhetorical techniques
English grammar
English phrases